The 17th Annual Petit Le Mans presented by Mazda was the 2014 edition of the Petit Le Mans automotive endurance race, held on September 30–October 3, 2014, at the Road Atlanta circuit in Braselton, Georgia, United States.  This marked the first Petit Le Mans run under the newly merged Tudor United Sportscar Championship.  As part of the new series, Daytona Prototype endurance-style cars were eligible to participate for the first time.  

The race was won by Wayne Taylor Racing in 10 hours (400 laps).  A record number of 13 cautions was set for the event.

Race

Race result

Class winners in bold.  Cars failing to complete 70% of their class winner's distance are marked as Not Classified (NC).

Race Statistics

References

2014 United SportsCar Championship season
2014 in sports in Georgia (U.S. state)
September 2014 sports events in the United States
October 2014 sports events in the United States
Motorsport in Georgia (U.S. state)